Sábado Gigante (English translation: "Giant Saturday" or "Gigantic Saturday"; known officially as Sábado Gigante Internacional outside Chile) is a Spanish-language television program broadcast by Spanish International Network in the United States. It was also Univision's longest-running program and the longest-running television variety series in world television history. Sábado Gigante was an eclectic and frenetic mix of various contests, human-interest stories, and live entertainment. From its start in 1962, it was hosted by Chilean TV star Mario Kreutzberger under the stage name of Don Francisco. Rolando Barral and Pedro De Pool began serving as a co-hosts in 1986; that role was taken over by Javier Romero in 1991.

The three-hour program aired on Univision each Saturday night at 8:00 p.m. (7:00 p.m. from 1987 to 2001). A new episode was produced every week throughout the show's history, with no reruns and only rare pre-emptions due to special programming (most notably by Teletón USA, an annual 24-hour telethon held each December, which Kreutzberger has hosted since its inception in 2012). On April 17, 2015, Univision announced that Sábado Gigante would end after 53 years, with its final episode (titled Sábado Gigante: Hasta Siempre; English translation: "Giant Saturday: Farewell" or "Gigantic Saturday: Farewell") airing on September 19, 2015. For the first time during the show's run, the final episode aired live in Chile, Mexico and the U.S. After the finale, Univision replaced it with a prerecorded Mexican show, Sabadazo, which premiered on October 30, 2010, on Televisa and September 2012 on Univision. It was later replaced with Crónicas de Sábado and Sal y Pimienta on Univision as Sabadazo was moved back to its original afternoon time slot (both shows were later replaced by 2-3 Liga MX association football games broadcast on the network under the name Sábado Futbolero broadcast during that league's season; Sabadazo was then canceled in 2015).

Broadcast history
[[File:Show Dominical ad.jpg|thumb|left|First advertisement of ''Sabado Gigantes first episode as Show Dominical]]
Kreutzberger originated the weekly program on August 5, 1962, airing on Canal 13 in Chile as Show Dominical ("Sunday's Show"). He had been inspired by television shows he had seen in the United States and Argentina but, as he explained, "My idea was mixing all the programs that I saw into one program."

The program's broadcasts were subsequently moved to Saturdays, and henceforth, was renamed Sábados Gigantes in 1963 and quickly developed a loyal following in Chile, and then throughout Latin America. In Chile, during the 1970s and 1980s, the show reached peak audiences of 80%. During this period, some episodes of the program lasted up to eight hours.

In its early years, the series was broadcast live with the exception of short segments; notable among the pre-taped segments was the travelogue, where Kreutzberger visited different locations around the world.

On April 12, 1986, Kreutzberger and the program moved to Miami, FL where it began to be produced by the Spanish International Network, now Univision (originally by their Miami affiliate, WLTV). At that time, the show's title was changed to the singular Sábado Gigante, although some longtime fans in Chile still call it by the pluralized title. On June 18, 2005, the series celebrated its 1,000th episode on Univisión, and on May 20, 2006, it celebrated its 20th anniversary in the U.S.  and on May 21, 2011, it celebrated its 25th anniversary on the Univision. On October 27, 2012, Sábado Gigante celebrated its 50th anniversary (counting both its runs in Chile and the U.S.).

For several years, two programs were recorded each week from identical sets:
 One in Miami, Florida for broadcast in most Latin American countries, as well as Canada, and Europe.
 One in Santiago, Chile for broadcast in that country (Kreutzberger's home country)

In 2000, the show was remotely broadcast from Los Angeles, California to coincide with the Mexican Independence Day celebrations. In June 2010, the final hour of the show was again remotely broadcast at the Home Depot Center in Carson to celebrate the start of the 2010 FIFA World Cup.

In 2011, following the Haiti earthquake, the show aired a special three-hour telethon benefiting the American Red Cross.

 Regular segments 

 El Chacal de la Trompeta (aka "La Gran Oportunidad") 
One of the show's signature segments, six contestants are given the chance to sing a song, with the bad performers being eliminated mid-song by "El Chacal", a ghost-like character who blows an old trumpet to end such acts (similar to The Gong Show). Unlike The Gong Show, El Chacal does not have to wait a specific amount of time before eliminating someone (on many occasions, contestants have been eliminated almost immediately after beginning their performance). Don Francisco would always get into the act, and wear silly hats and wigs to intimidate the contestant. From 2000-06, the eliminated performer would also be "fed" to a lion in his cave, with Don Francisco chanting "A los leones" (in addition to the usual "y....fuera!" chant). The "Lion" character was later phased out and would be "replaced" with an Alex the Lion doll. The "surviving" performers are voted on by the audience, with the one receiving the most applause winning a prize or cash (in this case, $1,000). The performer also has the chance to win an additional $1,000 by acquiring "La Corona", which would pre-qualify that performer into the "Reyes del Chacal" competition, which was held every two to four years (although this competition had not been held since 2010). From 1987 to 1993, any performer who advanced also received a six-pack of Coca-Cola.

A running gag of this segment occurs whenever Don Francisco sings during this segment, El Chacal would blow the trumpet mid-song, effectively insulting the host, who responds by kicking El Chacal. He would also kick the character if a bad call was made. Another running gag also had an attractive female performer "automatically" advancing before even singing.

El Chacal's name translates to "the Jackal" in English, and his antics are more in line with such, similar to a laughing hyena. However, there is a bit darker (or dark humor) meaning behind the character and his appearance. He actually has more similarities to an "Executioner" or a "Hooded Hatchetman", who used to kill people on the gallows or guillotine while wearing such a mask. Only in this case, he "kills off" acts of performers by playing the trumpet and not wielding an axe or guillotine.

In November 2013, Leonardo Núñez Guerrero, the man who played El Chacal for more than 20 years, was fired from the show by Don Francisco.

 Miss Colita 
A parody of beauty pageants, six women compete in swimsuits or other revealing attire for the title of Miss Colita. It is similar to the Brazilian contest "Miss Bumbum". The contest is usually held the Saturday before the Miss Venezuela, Miss USA and Miss Universe pageants, although it – or variants of the segment – are frequently held every two to four weeks. A Christmas-themed version, Miss Santita, is held the Saturday before Christmas. Another version, "Miss Colita Petite", features mainly smaller women. From 2003 to 2005, it was succeeded by a similar contest, "Miss Curvilinea", which focused more on the body type and form.  The final Miss Colita contest took place on August 22, 2015, the same night as the Miss Teen USA 2015 pageant.

It is also well known for the song "Mueve la colita", where the idea of the contest was conceived from; it has been an unofficial hymn of Sábado Gigante. Don Francisco had stated that the popularity of the song and its accompanying dance saved the program from an early cancellation in 1987, although this was not publicly revealed until 2012, during the show's 50th anniversary celebration.

This segment has been criticized by several former Miss Universe delegates including Alicia Machado, Justine Pasek, Mónica Spear, and Taliana Vargas due to the main focus of the contest being the buttocks. This led to the creation of Miss Curvilinea, among other similar contests.

 Miss Chiquitita 
This contest featured girls (usually children) competing for the title of Miss Chiquitita. The contest was held between 1994 and 1996, and was held in a two-month period; it was revived in July 2012 after a 16-year hiatus. The structure was similar to Miss America, sans the swimsuit and evening gown rounds.

 Clan Infantil/Los Niños de la Conversación 
This segment involved a group of children (usually regular attendees of the program with rotations every year) participating in a round table discussion with Don Francisco regarding various topics. Cap'n Crunch was a sponsor of this segment from 1995 to 2001 in the Univision version.

 Live entertainment 
Every hour of the show, recording artists and bands (usually from Latin America) perform songs live in front of the audience. Notable non-Spanish language artists/groups that performed in Sábado Gigante have included Pitbull, SkyBlu (of the group LMFAO), No Mercy, Eden's Crush, i5, Dream, Kiley Dean, Tony Bennett and Psy.

In addition to musical talent, other acts such as magicians, world record holders among others also perform their talents during the show.

 El Detector De Mentiras 
Whenever someone is accused of infidelity, Don Francisco puts that person to a lie detector test, conducted by retired police officer (and licensed polygraph) Joe Harper. While this is a serious segment, there is some humor, whenever Harper mispronounces the words in the questions since he is not fluent in Spanish, only to be criticized (and corrected) by Don Francisco.

There has been one instance where infidelity was not involved in this segment, when a woman believed to have had an encounter with extraterrestrial life in Battle Ground, Washington.

 Póngale Ritmo 
This segment is a dance competition. The first round has contestants perform a freestyle dance before a panel of judges. Only three are selected for the final rounds of the contest.

 La Cuatro 
At some point during the show, Don Francisco gets interrupted (and sometimes annoyed) by "La Cuatro" (initially named "La Cuatro Dientes" in Chile; played by Chilean singer and actress Gloria Benavides). She has a semi-romantic interest in Don Francisco, but would frequently pester him, including the use of bad jokes and bothering the audience. If La Cuatro pokes fun at various celebrities, Don Francisco warns her (numerous times) to not mess with them.

 Comedy segments 
There have been numerous comedic segments throughout the show's run. Some of the starring actors include: Frank Falcon, Miguel“El Flaco”, Gloria Ordonez, Carlos Justis, Juanito and Zulema Salazar. They were best known for helping launch the career of the Argentine model/vedette/actress Nanci Guerrero, who starred in a majority of these sketches. Most have included:
 La familia Fernández: A sketch involving a dysfunctional Mexican family. Two of the characters from the sketch, Julio (played by Carlos Yustis) and Maximo (played by Patricio Torres), later appeared in several other sketches of the show.
 La Oficina de Producción: One of Sábado Gigantes most popular sketches, it follows "network executives" – La Cuatro, Mr. James Douglas (the head executive who spoke only English in earlier sketches; Mr. Douglas also had a "ladies' man" persona), La Señorita Karina (a secretary who also acted as Mr. Douglas’ interpreter in the earlier sketches; played by Margarita Coego), Anabel (another secretary who replaced Karina; played by Nanci Guerrero), Ñañito (played by Armando Roblan), Osvaldo Zapata (a supervisor with a Western style), Ricky (a security guard), and Albertito (a chauffeur; played by Miguel González) – at a production office. Don Francisco precedes the sketch by calling one of the characters, while each sketch would end in bad luck, either by arrest, death, an unwanted situation or with Mr. Douglas "firing" one or all of the characters. Colgate also has been a sponsor of this particular sketch from 1993-2001.
 Hospital Gigante: A similar sketch in a hospital setting. This sketch was known for its suggestive/risqué themes, as La Doctora Cosabella (played by Guerrero) would often strip into her lingerie (whenever someone in the hospital shouts "Mequetrefe"). Rómulo (played by Miguel González), a paramedic, has a romantic interest in Cosabella. La Cuatro has a role as another doctor. González and Guerrero returned in-character in 2006, attempting to take Don Francisco to their hospital. Alfonso Zayas also acted in this segment.
 Hotel Gigante: A sketch set in a hotel. It is similar in format to "Hospital Gigante", albeit with different characters.
 Condominio Gigante: A sketch set in a condominium.
 Nave Espacial: A parody sketch of various science fiction films, mostly Star Trek. It is set in a space station.
 Cuatro Para Las Cuatro Con La Cuatro: Itself a parody of telenovelas, it follows La Cuatro as a maid in an apartment (later a mansion). Regular characters included Doña Concha (played by Adonis Losada) and Doña Eufrocina (played by Norma Zuñiga), Marcelo Jose (played by Carlos Farach), the residents, as well as an American businessman named Donald (aka "Nice to Meet You"; played by Aaron Hill). It was followed by two "sequels", La Posada and Don Medical Center, the latter a reboot of Hospital Gigante, while Hill later reprised his role as the "Nice to Meet You" character from 2013 until the show's cancellation in 2015 during La Cuatro's segments with Don Francisco.
 La cosa está dura: A sketch involving Mexican immigrants adjusting to typical American life.
 El hospital de la risa: Another sketch in a hospital setting.

 Animal-related contests 
There have been contests involving animals, usually pets. One of them, La gracias de mi mascota, features pets performing certain talents. Another variant, Igualito a mí mascota, features pets looking like their owners. Ron Magill, from the Metro Zoo in Miami, is a guest on the show whenever these contests are held. Another game, Los huevos de Ron Magill (named after Magill himself), has audience members attempt to replicate an animal's sound which, if one is performed successfully, then that person can reach their hand in an oversized egg for a chance to win up to US$1,500. The name of this contest is sometimes mocked by Don Francisco, who would intentionally use the more vulgar term of the word "huevos" (which is also a Spanish slang term meaning testicles), much to Magill's chagrin.

 Don Francisco's relationship with Magill 
It is noted that Magill had also been frequently criticized by Don Francisco, as well as (in some occasions) made fun of by the audience due to his poor Spanish-speaking ability (despite Magill's first language being Spanish during childhood). However, Magill has stated that he re-learned the language through his tenure on Sábado Gigante. During an interview, Magill (jokingly) stated that if he was fluent in Spanish, he would have not been allowed to participate in the show. Another running gag during these segments had Don Francisco constantly annoy Magill while holding certain animals (mostly those potentially dangerous to humans) by constantly asking questions about the animal held.

These gags would later carry over on Don Francisco's later programs (Don Francisco Te Invita and Siempre Niños, both on Telemundo) after the cancellation of Sábado Gigante, whenever Magill is a guest on them.

 Romance-themed contests 
Throughout the show's run, there have been competitions involving romantic themes, often rotated weekly. The contests have included the following:Solteras Sin Compromiso: A competition involving single women vying to win a date with one of the single men featured in the segment. This competition was primarily played in the Chilean version during the early years of the program. A similar contest played in the Univision version, Solteros y Solteras features single men and women and uses a battle of the sexes format.Todo Por El Amor: A series of competitions involving married and unmarried couples. The competitions are done in rounds, with the couple with the most points at the end of the contests wins a cash prize of US$5,000. A running gag of these contests involves Don Francisco slapping the husband/boyfriend if he was not behaving during his relationship with his significant other.

The car games, a.k.a. "Final de Automóvil"
Throughout the show's run on Univision, a disclaimer said by either Don Francisco, Javier Romero or one of the co-presenters precedes the car games by stating: "Any contestant that wishes to win the car must participate in the car games in-person. Neither Sábado Gigante or Univision ask for money in exchange for prizes, if you receive a call asking for money in exchange for a prize [from someone claiming to be on behalf of Univision or Sábado Gigante], please call the corresponding authorities." while the same disclaimer is shown on-screen at the end of the program. A similar disclaimer is also used for the Chilean version of Gigante hosted by Don Francisco's daughter, Vivi. Contestants must be 18 and older to compete for the car, while there have been instances that a contestant’s younger family member (often their children/grandchildren) would participate alongside them. It has been revealed that the winning contestants have to wait 30 days for their cars to be delivered to them and that the actual car varied from the one shown in the program.

Cars given away in the U.S. program have included those from Ford Motor Company (1986–89, 1999–2014, 2015 for the final show), Toyota (1987?-1990?), General Motors (1986-1987) Honda (1990–99), Daewoo (2000), Hyundai (2005–09) and Kia Motors (2014-2015). In Chile, some cars given away include Volkswagen, Lada, Renault-Samsung, Arica-Mini, and Subaru. During the show's early years in the U.S. and during the final episode, the cars were provided by Miami-based dealership Gus Machado Ford. Javier Romero would also plug the cars, either with a detailed or a more generic description, the latter without mentioning the make, model or the manufacturer. The former was solely used in the U.S. (from 1989-2012), while the latter was used in international broadcasts and for taped episodes. The plugs, especially for when Hondas were used as the car prizes, were also known for the use of a distinct background music, which was dropped after Hondas were no longer used (the Honda background music remained in place for the generic descriptions used for broadcasts outside the U.S., until 2010).

While the car prizes in the program were usually either compact and/or mid-size cars (the latter being usually sedans), larger cars such as pickup trucks and SUVs were also used as car prizes.

In the Chilean version, cars may be used as one of the regular prizes during some of the games. In addition to cars, houses were even given away as grand prizes for certain games, most notably from the ones sponsored by La Tomboleta.

From 1992-98, Polaroid was the main sponsor of the car games (with rotations from the show's other sponsors). From 1998-2005, AmericaTel, a long-distance phone service once endorsed by Don Francisco, succeeded Polaroid as the sponsor.

In 2000 and from 2005 to 2009, another car prize (usually from a different manufacturer) was offered at the end of the first hour of the show.

Prior to the revamping in 2008, the games played for the car were similar to the pricing games seen on The Price Is Right, but were based on luck rather than having the contestant guess the actual price of the car (with very few games focusing on guessing the pricing the car). These have included a game with a staircase of buttons in any of these three colors (red, green (yellow originally), or blue) with the contestant selecting two rows (one for the contestant, the other for Don Francisco) and trying to avoid a "broken" button (indicated by an alarm) to win (this game was relaunched in 2005 with a man in a cherry picker, usually a stunt double, falling out of it if the broken button was pushed (this was phased out in 2007), a green row of buttons, replacing the yellow and a minor rule change of $100 each for the initial five buttons, decreased from the $250). If the contestant or Don Francisco pushes the broken button, the contestant would lose the game. A similar version was played in Chile, where Don Francisco and the contestant used a plastic revolver-like pistol; should the pistol click without firing, the contestant would also win a displayed prize for each successful click. Otherwise, the contestant would lose if the pistol fired (this version was discontinued in 1987 due to the use of the pistols bringing concerns of gun violence in Chile and globally, which was also one of the reasons this version was rarely played in the U.S. version). The concept is loosely based on The Price Is Rights "Ten Chances" pricing game, albeit largely unrelated. It was also the only game where the host also played a participation role.

This game is similar to The Price Is Rights "Any Number" pricing game. Contestants can call out digits one at a time, revealing them in the retail prices of four prizes on the gameboard, and wins the first prize whose price is completely revealed. A gameboard contains spaces representing five digits in the price of a car, four digits in the price of a trip anywhere in the world (mainly a Spanish-speaking country, usually Mexico or Central America), four digits representing an amount of money that is valued at more than $1,000 (similar to a piggy bank), and three digits in the price of a smaller prize (usually a Polaroid camera and it's corresponding film due to their sponsorship). The first digit in the price of the car is revealed at the beginning of the game (a rule implemented after cars valued at more than $10,000 were used in the game). Another game, similar to The Price Is Rights "One Away" and "Race Game" pricing games, had contestants try to rearrange a wrong price to the correct one within a 30-second time limit, in which the contestant wins the car and various other prizes if they get the correct price (representing the total retail value of all prizes). In 1999, the contestant had 60 seconds (later 40 seconds in 2006) to re-arrange these songs from each artist or as well cities/capitol from each country. If there is less than 6 right, the contestant can try again to rearrange. However, if the contestant successfully gets all 6 right before time expires, the contestant wins the car and $6,000.

Another game involved 10 cardboard keys (which resembled large keycards) with the contestant having to choose the key (with a set number of chances) that opens the large "vault" containing the car inside (similar to The Price Is Rights "Master Key" and "Safe Crackers" pricing games). In 1995, the "vault" changed color from gold to blue. In 1999, the "vault" were changed into rainbow colors: red, yellow, green and blue; that a relaunch of the game had all the finalists choose one key each and was expanded to 20 keys, whilst the 2006 relaunch returned to the old format, but with a makeover (it resembled a bank vault and the 16 keys in-game were modeled after real keys). From 1993-95, a giant die rolled from the bleachers determine the number of keys to pick (a fish bowl was used from 2006–08). If the vault opens in which they pick the winning key number, a siren went off and the contestant wins the car. Otherwise, the buzzer will sound if the vault does not open in which the contestant picks the wrong key number (with Don Francisco showing the audience the winning key number in an envelope and, occasionally, using that key to open the vault). There have been multiple occasions where contestants won the car on the first/only key. This game was considered the most popular car game of the show and is the first car game played. This game now appears occasionally, with all finalists each picking the key they believe opens the car door. And if the car door opens, they will win a new car. During gameplay, whenever contestants are on their sole/final key, Don Francisco would offer a cash prize (up to $2,000) in exchange for their key (there have been multiple instances where contestants picked the winning key but took the cash prizes). The final episode in September 2015 had a guaranteed winner of a car, as five members of the audience were allowed to pick a key from a bowl and try it in the door lock. The third contestant was successful.

There are several games that used the "3 Strikes" concept (with the El Chacal de la Trompeta character image used as the "strikes" from 1996-2015). A basic version has contestants choose one of 12 slots which contain either a wheel, El Chacal or the Sabado Gigante logo. Each wheel adds $1,000 to the player's score, and if the contestant successfully finds all 4 wheels, the contestant wins $4,000 and the car. If the contestant finds the Sábado Gigante logo, it will eliminate one strike and, from 1988–99, awarded a $500 bonus, in which the contestant got to keep regardless of outcome. A variant of this game uses people holding large cards containing El Chacal, the Wheel and the Sábado Gigante logo. This version appears mainly in special episodes of the show and whenever the show is broadcast outside Miami. Notable participants have included Nuestra Belleza Latina/Miss Venezuela contestants, association football players (mainly those from Liga MX clubs or from the Mexico national team), Sábado Gigante characters, Miss Colita contestants among others.

The number of panels is determined by the number of players competing during the show (consisting of those that earned a panel through winning the show’s other contests as well as randomly-selected audience members). One of them has the word "Auto" in it, while the others have El Chacal (the 1998-2008 version included one panel with the “Auto” marker, several panels with amounts of cash (up to $300) and one or two panels with a "Muchas Gracias" marker). The contestant who finds the Auto panel, moves on to the car game. Another method existed where playing cards were used, with the contestant that drew an Ace advancing to the car game.

There was one game where contestants are given a survey question and must correctly guess five responses related to the question (similar to Family Feud). Other games have included a matching game where contestants must match the names of pictured items (usually those of celebrities, places, etc.) as well as a game where the contestant must answer either yes or no before a statement/question was displayed (similar to truth or dare?), with them winning the car (alongside other prizes) in the statement/question if answered correctly.

The new car games introduced in 2008, which are essentially updated and digitalized versions of older games, have included:
 A car puzzle, which contestants find the parts of a digitalized car. Each piece adds $1,000 to the player's score, while El Chacal takes money away. The first one takes $1,000 from the player, the second deducts $2,000 and everything for all three; thus it is possible to have a negative amount after the first and/or second mistake. If the player successfully finds all 7 parts of a digitalized car without finding El Chacal 3 times, the player wins a brand-new car and whatever money has been accumulated (up to $7,000; should the player correctly find parts of the car before finding El Chacal, they win the money accumulated regardless of outcome). This was based on an older game where players spell out the word "Gigante", similar to The Price Is Rights "Spelling Bee" pricing game and was played using the 3 Strikes. The 1989-95 version was structured similar to The Price Is Rights "3 Strikes" pricing game, where the contestant would reach their hand down to a box and pick up the game pieces with the letters or strikes on them, whilst the 1999-2008 version was modified where the contestant picks up the pieces on the game board, similar to the aforementioned show’s “Punch-a-Bunch” game.
 A virtual race, where contestants select a colored stock car (Red, Green or Blue) – which closely resemble Formula One cars – and wins if the chosen color places first. This preceded a similar game where the 2001-05 version included a car, El Chacal, and a cruise ship (if the ship placed first, the contestant wins a cruise to an unspecified location). The 2006-08 version depicted a horse race and is similar to the current format. This game was played twice during the final episode with three contestants choosing each colored car. This was similar to The Price Is Rights "Rat Race" pricing game.
 A roulette game, where players spin a virtual wheel and try to stop at the car space five times. There are 6 parts of a car spinning around a virtual wheel including a gallon of gasoline, license plate, car door (replicating a Ford Fiesta door), steering wheel, car key, and a car tire/wheel. Each parts of a car adds $1,000 to the player's score, and if the contestant successfully stops at the car space 5 times without stopping at the "Chacal" space 3 times, the contestant wins a brand-new car and whatever money has accumulated. The older versions have the word "Auto" and "Chacal" and amounts of cash (between $500 and $1,500) on a physical wheel. Additionally, the 1998-99 version, which was filmed separately from the main program, also had the actual car center stage, with the wheel on the right side, drawings of cars on the top center above the car and those of El Chacal on the left. The 2000-08 version was downsized to a single game board, eliminating the center stage, while that same version was later modified with new color schemes.
 There was another game in which a contestant picks a door up or down, and are then shown a number and the contestants are asked if the next door's number is higher or lower. Each correct answer adds $1,000 to their score, and if the contestant successfully gets 5 out of 7 right without making 2 mistakes, the contestant wins $5,000 and a brand-new car. This is similar to the overall gameplay of Card Sharks. The 1996-99 version was played differently, where the contestant must collect cards containing five pictures of a disproportionate car, which closely resembled one from the animated series The Flintstones (equaling 1 part each), with the adjacent card being a drawing of a monster (named after El Chacal de la Trompeta despite it not looking like the character). Additionally, If the contestant draws a card with a gold seal of the car, the player automatically wins the car and whatever money accumulated. This version also became a playable Flash game on the show's website and was considered the most difficult game on the show. The 1999-2008 version is similar to the current format (made in response to the difficulty of the first version) and was first played using large playing cards (with Jacks, Kings and Queens being equal to 10, and Aces either 1 or 11; Should multiple rows of cards contain the same number and all rows have exhausted before winning the car, the contestant wins whatever money accumulated, while they sometimes would also lose the game if they already had an incorrect answer). The game board also was overhauled with ice-platinum borders, wheel lights, a cardboard cut-out of a car and two El Chacal silhouettes. In 2002, the "playing cards" were replaced by large flash cards with the Sábado Gigante logo and a number (1-12) on each side. This was the only car game in the show to have its gameplay changed.

 Irregular segments 

 Coro Millionario 
A competition where three contestants must answer a riddle with the clues “sung” to them by a on-stage choir. This game debuted in the Univision program in 1990 and was played semi-regularly until 1995. The game would return for a week in 1999 and as a three-week limited run in 2008, the latter of which was the final playing of the competition.

 La Cámara Viajera 
La Cámara Viajera ("The Traveling Camera") is the show's travelogue segment – which only appeared occasionally (regularly until 2004)  – where Don Francisco visits a selected country where he mainly talks about the culture and its attractions. The segment has taken him to over 185 countries worldwide, many of them more than once. It was also known for its long-term sponsorship with American Airlines on the Univision program, which precedes the segment by advertising daily flights from Miami (where the program was taped) to the location of that week's segment. Additionally, American Airlines commercials would also traditionally air during the commercial break after the segment.

 Talent Competitions 
There also have been numerous talent competitions throughout the program's run (which are held every 1–4 years). They have included:
 Gigantes de Mañana/Estrellas del Futuro: A singing competition for children and young adults, who performed at one point in specific music genres (Regional Mexican music and Reggaeton, both in 2005). 
 Idolos de la Canción: A competition with participants emulating various singers.
 Reyes del Chacal: A competition consisting of past winners of the "El Chacal de la Trompeta" segment.
 Ritmo Dieta: A Zumba-style weight loss competition similar to Póngale Ritmo.
 Diva Latina/Viva la Diva: A singing competition consisting of young women.

Product placement
Throughout the show's run, product placement has been a vital part of Sabado Gigante. Whenever a certain product is advertised during the show, Don Francisco, along with the audience, would sing that product's jingle. Otherwise, he, one of the co-presenters or Javier Romero will describe the product. Most products, such as Cookie Crisp and Chex cereals (when they were produced by Ralston), would often alternate weekly or monthly. Other products advertised on the Univision-produced Sabado Gigante have included AARP, AC Delco, Allstate, American Airlines (for the show's travel segment "La Camara Viajera"), Aunt Jemima, AutoZone, Banco Popular, Café Bustelo, Cap'n Crunch, Claritin, Coca-Cola, Colgate-Palmolive, Coors, Dog Chow (alternates with its Puppy Chow counterpart), DirecTV, Domino's Pizza, Downy, Dr. Pepper, Ferrero Rocher, Ford, Gatorade, Goya, The Home Depot, Kool-Aid, Listerine, M&M's (alternates with its sister brands Snickers, Skittles and Starburst), Maxwell House, Mazola, McDonald's, Miller (for the live musical performances), Nabisco, Orville Redenbacher's, Oscar Mayer, Pam, Pampers, Payless ShoeSource, Pedigree, Pepto-Bismol (with occasional phone-in "appearances" by El Profesor, a mascot for Pepto-Bismol used for the Hispanic market), Pert Plus, Polaroid (for the car games; originally for La Camara Viajera), Quaker Instant Oatmeal (most often for El Chacal de La Trompeta; From 1998-99, Sobrecito, an anthropomorphic packet of the oatmeal, was used as a mascot; although it is unclear whether or not the mascot was used in advertising for the oatmeal outside of the program), Secret Deodorant, Sprint, Starbucks, State Farm, Tide, Walgreens and Walmart.

 Adonis Losada's arrest, conviction and prison life 
In September 2009, comedian Adonis Losada, who played Doña Concha on the show, was arrested and subsequently charged with 30 counts of possession of child pornography after detectives in Boynton Beach, Florida alleged that he uploaded one of the images to a social networking site. Police found 18 images of child pornography on a hard drive in his home. Following the arrest, the Doña Concha character was scrapped from Sábado Gigante. On July 7, 2016, Losada was found guilty and sentenced to 153 years in prison.

See also
Armando Navarrete Navarrete - who played Mandolino''' in the show

References

External links
 Official website
 Entrevista primer director Sabados Gigantes, Arturo Nicoletti

Univision original programming
Canal 13 (Chilean TV channel) original programming
1962 Chilean television series debuts
2015 Chilean television series endings
1960s Chilean television series
1970s Chilean television series
1980s Chilean television series
1990s Chilean television series
2000s Chilean television series
2010s Chilean television series
1986 American television series debuts
1980s American game shows
1990s American game shows
2000s American game shows
2010s American game shows
2015 American television series endings
Spanish-language television programming in the United States